Owenmore Gaels is a Gaelic Athletic Association club based within the parish of Collooney and Kilvarnet (Ballinacarrow) in County Sligo, Republic of Ireland. Its origins date back to the formation of the GAA in Sligo in 1885, when the Collooney Fontenoys club was formed. It went under a number of names, including Collooney Harps and Collooney/Ballisodare, before the current name was adopted in 1976.

Honours
 Sligo Senior Football Championship: (5)
(Collooney Harps - 1942, 1943, 1965, Collooney/Ballisodare - 1967, 1969)
 Sligo Junior Football Championship: (3)
(Collooney Harps - 1930, 1962, Owenmore Gaels - 2015)
 Sligo Under 20 Football Championship: (2)
 1982, 1984
 Sligo Minor Football Championship: (9)
(Collooney Harps - 1940, 1943, 1944, 1961, 1962, 1963, 1965, Ballinacarrow - 1947, 1958)
 Sligo Under-16 Football Championship: (1)
 2014
 Sligo Senior Football League (Division 1): (3)
(Collooney Harps - 1963, 1964, 1966)
 Sligo Intermediate Football League Division 3 (ex Div. 2): (3)
 1982, 2012, 2015, 2018
 Sligo Intermediate Football League (Division 4): (2)
 2006, 2010
 Benson Cup: (1)
 1993
 Abbott Cup: (1)
 2015

References

Gaelic games clubs in County Sligo